Radio Télévision nationale congolaise (RTNC) is the national broadcaster of the Democratic Republic of the Congo. It is government controlled in a country with a poor record on press freedom. Radio-Télévision Nationale Congolaise currently broadcasts in Lingala, French, and English.

References

External links
Official site

Publicly funded broadcasters
French-language television networks
Radio stations established in 1971
Television channels and stations established in 1997
Television stations in the Democratic Republic of the Congo
State media
Radio in the Democratic Republic of the Congo